A Complicated Story is a Hong Kong drama film, directed by Kiwi Chow based on the novel of the same title by Yi Shu. The film is headlined by actors Jacky Cheung, Jacqueline Zhu, Stephanie Che, and Zi Yi. The film had its world premiere at the Hong Kong International Film Festival on 26 March 2013, and was theatrically released in Hong Kong on 16 January 2014.

Cast
Jacky Cheung as Yuk Cheung
Jacqueline Zhu as Liu Yazi
Stephanie Che as Kammy Au
Zi Yi as Law Chun Ming
Lo Hoi-pang as Wan
Cherrie Ying as Tracy T.
Deanie Ip as Gipsy
Elaine Jin
Lee Ou Fan
John Shum as Steven
Tina Lau

References

2013 films
Hong Kong drama films
2013 drama films
2010s Cantonese-language films
Milkyway Image films
Films set in Hong Kong
Films shot in Hong Kong
Films based on Chinese novels
2013 directorial debut films
2010s Hong Kong films